USAAS may refer to:

United States Army Air Service
United States Army Ambulance Service